Kapwa Ko Mahal Ko (international title: My Brother's Keeper / ) is a Philippine television public service show broadcast by GMA Network. Originally hosted by Rosa Rosal, Orly Mercado and Antonio Talusan, it premiered on December 1, 1975. Produced by Kapwa Ko, Mahal Ko Foundation, Inc., it is the longest running program and the first television program to use sign language interpreters in Philippine television. Mercado and Connie Angeles currently serve as the hosts.

The series is streaming online on YouTube.

Overview
It was first broadcast on GMA Network on December 1, 1975, with Rosa Rosal, Orly Mercado and Antonio Talusan serving as the hosts. In June 1976, the Kapwa Ko Mahal Ko Foundation was established. In the 1980s, Boots Anson Roa, Susan Valdez, Connie Angeles, and Cielito del Mundo joined the show as hosts. Two doctors, Susy Pineda and Nonoy Zuñiga also joined the show. In the 1990s, Mildred Ortega, Rose "Manang Rose" Clores, and Toni Rose Gayda became part of the show.

Hosts

 Orly Mercado 
 Connie Angeles 
 Camille Angeles 

Former hosts
 Rosa Rosal 
 Antonio Talusan 
 Nonoy Zuñiga 
 Boots Anson-Roa 
 Tina Monzon-Palma 
 Rosemarie Gil
 Susan Valdez
 Helen Vela 
 Juan Flavier 
 Cielito del Mundo 
 Rose Clores 
 Mildred Ortega
 Gina de Venecia
 Toni Rose Gayda

Production
In March 2020, production was halted due to the enhanced community quarantine in Luzon caused by the COVID-19 pandemic.

Accolades

References

External links
 
 

1975 Philippine television series debuts
Charities based in the Philippines
Filipino-language television shows
GMA Network original programming
Philippine television shows
Sign language television shows
Television productions suspended due to the COVID-19 pandemic